Emmad Irfani is a Pakistani model and actor. He has done lead roles in many TV serials from Geo TV, ARY Digital and Hum TV while as a fashion model he has worked with national and international brands.

Early life and career
Of Kashmiri Muslim descent, Irfani belongs to a family of military background, thus visiting almost all Pakistan during his childhood till his father retired and settled in Lahore. Filmmaker Farjad Nabi is his cousin. He did his Graduation and Masters from Lahore.

Irfani was forced into modelling by a family member in 2002. He first worked with HSY then with Khaadi, Hang Ten, Charcoal, Nilopher Shahid, Bunto Kazmi, Nomi Ansari, Deepak Perwani, Maria B, Karma and others. He also worked with some international brands such Versace Dior, Levis, DKNY, Parada and Armani in Paris and Milan. He won Best Male model awards at the Lux Style Awards and MTV Pakistan style awards, and subsequently was nominated in 2006 and 2007. 

In 2013 he started focusing on acting and since worked for many TV serials including Geo TV, ARY Digital and Hum TV. In 2018 he launched his film career with a cameo role in his cousin Farjad Nabi's box-office hit film 7 Din Mohabbat In and his debut lead role upcoming film is Aasmaan Bolay Ga (2023) directed by Shoaib Mansoor.

Filmography

Television

Telefilms

Films

References

External links
 
 
 

Living people
1980 births
Pakistani male models
Pakistani male television actors
Pakistani male film actors
21st-century Pakistani male actors
Pakistani people of Kashmiri descent
People from Peshawar
Kashmiri male models